David French Boyd (October 5, 1834 – May 27, 1899) was an American teacher and educational administrator.  He served as the first head of Louisiana State University (LSU), where he was a professor of mathematics and moral philosophy.  He was also briefly the president of the Agricultural and Mechanical College of Alabama (now Auburn University).

Biography

Boyd, the eldest son of Thomas J. Boyd, a wealthy lawyer and railroad promoter, was born in Wytheville, Virginia. He studied at the University of Virginia but failed to graduate. Because of personal difficulties in his native state, he migrated to Louisiana and, in 1860, joined the faculty of the newly created Louisiana State Seminary of Learning in Pineville in Central Louisiana. There, he became a close friend of the institution's superintendent, William Tecumseh Sherman, who on the eve of the American Civil War famously warned Boyd, an enthusiastic secessionist, of the South's folly in pursuing a war with the North which it could not possibly win.

During the war, Boyd fought in the Confederate army. He initially served in the 9th Louisiana Infantry, a regiment that was part of the famed Louisiana Tigers of the Army of Northern Virginia. He later transferred to the Western Theater, where he was a major of engineering. He was captured by Jayhawker militia and sold to the Union Army before being exchanged and returned to the South following Sherman's intervention.

After the end of the war in 1865, Boyd returned to the Seminary as superintendent and later wrote the charter that transformed the institution into Louisiana State University, based in Baton Rouge, under the terms of the Morrill Land-Grant Colleges Act. He was dismissed in 1880 over conflicts with the faculty, but was restored as president of LSU in 1884. During his hiatus, he served a year as the president of Auburn University in Auburn, Alabama.

He died in 1899, and is buried in Magnolia Cemetery in Baton Rouge.

References
About Louisiana State University
 Germaine M. Reed, David French Boyd: Founder of Louisiana State University, LSU University Press, 1977.
 David F. Boyd manuscripts, Walter L. Fleming collection, Louisiana State University, http://www.lib.lsu.edu/special/findaid/0890m.pdf

1834 births
1899 deaths
American Civil War prisoners of war
Confederate States Army officers
Leaders of Louisiana State University
Louisiana Tigers
University of Virginia alumni
Presidents of Auburn University
People from Wytheville, Virginia
People from Pineville, Louisiana
People of Louisiana in the American Civil War